Penaincisalia is a genus of butterflies in the family Lycaenidae. It contains the following species, all found in the Neotropical realm:

partial list
 Penaincisalia alatus Druce 1907
 Penaincisalia anosma Draudt 1921
 Penaincisalia atymna (Hewitson, 1870)
 Penaincisalia bimediana Johnson 1990
 Penaincisalia candor Druce 1907
 Penaincisalia carmela Johnson 1990
 Penaincisalia caudata Johnson 1990
 Penaincisalia culminicola Staudinger 1894
 Penaincisalia descimoni Johnson 1990
 Penaincisalia downeyi Johnson 1990
 Penaincisalia loxurina (C. & R. Felder, 1865)
 Penaincisalia oribata Weymer 1890
 Penaincisalia patagonaevaga Johnson 1990
 Penaincisalia pichincha Johnson 1990
 Penaincisalia rawlinsi Johnson 1990

References

Eumaeini
Lycaenidae of South America
Lycaenidae genera